Donelson is a surname of Scottish origin and it is a variant of the name Donaldson which is a patronymic for the name Donald. Donaldson is also an English rendering of the name MacDonald. The name MacDonald in some cases became Donaldson and due to pronunciation of the name it corrupted to Donelson. Notable people with the surname include:

Andrew Jackson Donelson (1799–1871), American diplomat
Daniel Smith Donelson (1802–1863), American soldier and politician
Emily Donelson (1807–1836), American niece of Rachel Donelson
John Donelson (1718–1785), American frontiersman and politician
Rachel Donelson (1767–1828), American wife of Andrew Jackson

Anglicised Scottish Gaelic-language surnames
Scottish surnames
Patronymic surnames